Languedoc (D653) is an Aquitaine-class frigate of the French Navy. The Aquitaine class were developed from the FREMM multipurpose frigate program.

Development and design 
In November 2005 France announced a contract of €3.5 billion for development and the first eight hulls, with options for nine more costing €2.95 billion split over two tranches (totaling 17).

Following the cancellation of the third and fourth of the s in 2005 on budget grounds, requirements for an air-defence derivative of the FREMM called FREDA were placed – with DCNS coming up with several proposals. Expectations were that the last two ships of the 17 FREMM planned would be built to FREDA specifications; however, by 2008 the plan was revised down to just 11 FREMM (9 ASW variants and 2 FREDA variants) at a cost of €8.75 billion (FY13, ~US$12 billion). The 11 ships would cost €670 million (~US$760m) each in FY2014, or €860m (~US$980m) including development costs. In 2015, the total number of ASW variants was further reduced to just six units, including Languedoc.

Construction and career 
Languedoc was developed as part of a joint Italian-French program known as FREMM, which was implemented to develop a new class of frigates for use by various European navies. Constructed from 2011. On 12 July 2014, the frigate Languedoc was launched.

On 14 April 2018, the frigate participated in the bombing of Barzeh and Him Shinshar in Syria with the United States and the United Kingdom. Neither  nor  were able to fire their missiles, and it was Languedoc which carried out by firing three MdCN of which this is the first operational use.

Languedoc was engaged, alongside  and a Atlantique maritime patrol plane, in Operation Agenor for the benefit of the European Union (within the framework of EMASOH) for the surveillance of the Strait of Hormuz from 19 May 2020, replacing the frigate . On 6 August 2020, the incorporation of Languedoc into the operation was extended by three months thanks to the replacement of crew B by the A – which is a first for a French Navy vessel in operation since the passage to double crew in 2019, carried out in 72 hours at the French naval base in Abu Dhabi at Port Zayed, thus ensuring the permanence and continuity of the frigate's commitment to its mission. The frigate was then accompanied by  replacing HNLMS De Ruyter.

Gallery

References 

2014 ships
Aquitaine-class frigates
Ships built in France